is a city located in Fukushima Prefecture, Japan. , the city had an estimated population of 34,631, and a population density of 180 persons per km2 in 14,358 households.

Geography
Sōma is located in northeastern Fukushima Prefecture, bordered by the Pacific Ocean to the east and the Abukuma Plateau to the west. Sōma is closer to Sendai in Miyagi Prefecture than it is to the prefectural capital of Fukushima.

Mountains
Mount Ryōzen (825m)
Rivers
Uda River
Coastal features
Matsukawa Lagoon

Neighboring municipalities
Fukushima Prefecture
Minamisōma
Iitate
Date
Shinchi
Miyagi Prefecture
Marumori

Climate
Sōma has a humid climate (Köppen climate classification Cfa) characterized by mild summers and cold winters with heavy snowfall.  The average annual temperature in Sōma is 12.6 °C. The average annual rainfall is 1260 mm with September as the wettest month. The temperatures are highest on average in August, at around 24.8 °C, and lowest in January, at around 1.8 °C.

Demographics
Per Japanese census data, the population of Sōma has remained the same over the past 40 years.

History
The area of present-day Sōma was part of ancient Mutsu Province, and has been settled since at least the Jōmon period. During the Edo period, the area developed as the castle town of Sōma Domain, home of the Sōma clan from the Kamakura period until the Boshin War. After the Meiji Restoration, it was organized as part of Iwaki Province. With the establishment of the modern municipalities system on April 1, 1896, the area was organized into a number of towns and villages within the districts of Namekata and Uda. In 1896, Namekata and Uda were merged to create Sōma District. The town of Nakamura was established on April 1, 1889. Nakamura was merged with seven neighbouring villages and raised to city status on March 31, 1954, becoming the city of Sōma.

2011 earthquake and tsunami
The eastern, coastal portion of Sōma was inundated by tsunami flood waters following the magnitude 9.1 2011 Tōhoku earthquake and tsunami off its coastline on March 11, 2011. The tsunami reached up to approximately 4 km inland in Sōma; flooded areas included Sōma Port and the Matsukawa-ura Bay area, up to the elevated Route 6 Sōma Bypass. The tsunami was measured to have been 9.3 meters or higher in Sōma.

Government
Sōma has a mayor-council form of government with a directly elected mayor and a unicameral city legislature of 20 members. Sōma, together with the town of Shinchi contributes one member to the Fukushima Prefectural Assembly. In terms of national politics, the city is part of Fukushima 1st district of the lower house of the Diet of Japan.

Economy
Sōma has a mixed economy, based on agriculture, commercial fishing and light manufacturing. The area is noted for its strawberry cultivation. The Shinchi Thermal Power Station, a coal-fired thermal power station is located in Sōma.

Education
Sōma has nine public elementary schools and four public junior high schools operated by the city and two public high schools operated by the Fukushima Prefectural Board of Education. The prefecture also operates one special education school.

Hospital
Soma General Hospital, a public hospital with 240 beds, is located in Sōma.

Transportation

Railway
 East Japan Railway Company (JR East) - Jōban Line
  -

Highway
  – Sōma Interchange
  – Sōma Interchange – Sōma Yamakami Interchange – Sōma Tamano Interchange

Seaports
Port of Soma

Local attractions
The Sōma horse-chasing Festival held on July 23 to 25 every year is a designated an Important Intangible Folk Cultural Property.
Sōma Nakamura Castle ruins
Sōma Nakamura Shrine
Matsukawaura Prefectural Natural Park
Mount Ryōzen, National Place of Scenic Beauty and a National Historic Site

Noted people from Sōma 
Tochiazuma Tomoyori, sumo wrestler
Takahiro Suzuki, professional baseball player
Tikashi Fukushima, artist.

References

Further reading

External links

Official Website 

 
Cities in Fukushima Prefecture
Populated coastal places in Japan
Port settlements in Japan